The enzyme disulfoglucosamine-6-sulfatase (EC 3.1.6.1) catalyzes the reaction

2-N,6-O-disulfo-D-glucosamine + H2O  2-N-sulfo-D-glucosamine + sulfate

This enzyme belongs to the family of hydrolases, specifically those acting on sulfuric ester bonds.  The systematic name is 2-N,6-O-disulfo-D-glucosamine 6-sulfohydrolase. Other names in common use include N-sulfoglucosamine-6-sulfatase, and 6,N-disulfoglucosamine 6-O-sulfohydrolase.

References 

EC 3.1.6
Enzymes of unknown structure